Live Cult was recorded live at the Marquee Club, London on 27 November 1991.  This compilation was originally released in 1993 with the purchase of the Pure Cult: For Rockers, Ravers, Lovers and Sinners video which included all of their singles and several of the strongest album tracks from 1984 to 1993.  However, only disc one of this two-disc set was included, as well as an order form to purchase disc two.
In 2000, this compilation was re-released with both CDs.
According to the liner notes this recording was "completely live" with no overdubs or edits in the final version on CD.

Track listing
All tracks written by Ian Astbury and Billy Duffy.

Part One

 "Nirvana" 4:36
 "Lil' Devil" 2:59
 "Spiritwalker" 3:53
 "Horse Nation" 3:52
 "Zap City" 5:09
 "Brother Wolf, Sister Moon" 6:41
 "Revolution" 6:16
 "Love" 5:58
 "Rain" 5:21

Part Two

 "The Phoenix" 4:59
 "Wild Flower" 4:14
 "She Sells Sanctuary" 4:36
 "Full Tilt" 4:48
 (amplification breakdown) 5:28
 "Peace Dog" 4:12
 "Love Removal Machine" 5:52
 "Earth Mofo" 6:13
 "Fire Woman" 6:19

The track marked "amplification breakdown" refers to an unplanned break in the show when Billy Duffy's amp stopped working and had to be repaired, while Ian briefly talks with the audience to pass the time and keep the audience from getting angry with the unexpected break in the show.

Personnel
The Cult
 Ian Astbury – vocals
 Billy Duffy – Guitar
 Kinley Wolfe – Bass
 Michael Lee – drums
 John Sinclair – keyboards
Technical
 Mixed by Chris Sheldon
 Engineered by Gary Stewart

References 

The Cult albums
1993 live albums
Beggars Banquet Records live albums
Live albums recorded at The Marquee Club